Björn Emilio "William" Stridh (born 16 August 1997) is a Swedish singer. He competed in Idol 2018 and finished fifth. He participated in Melodifestivalen 2020 with the song "Molnljus", in the fourth semifinal in Malmö he placed fifth. His debut EP, Faller, was released on 14 May 2021 via Sony Music.

Discography

EPs
 Faller (2021)

Singles

References

External links 

Living people
Idol (Swedish TV series) participants
1997 births
Melodifestivalen contestants of 2020